Sun Jiagan (1683–1753) was a Chinese politician of the Qing dynasty.

Born in Taiyuan, Shanxi, Sun was son of a family that was so poor that he had to work hard all day collecting firewood, and could only study at night.

In 1713, he graduated as a jinshi in the imperial examination during the reign of the Kangxi Emperor and rose to the position of Libu Shilang for his frankness and uprightness.

After holding various posts, in 1741 Sun became Viceroy of Huguang, where he introduced the system of subsidized chiefs, in order to keep the aborigines under control.

In 1743, he was relieved from his position due to shielding his men, yet was recalled to be head of the Imperial Clan Court in 1744., but resumed office and served as Gongbu Shangshu in 1750.

Notes

References 

Herbert Allen Giles, A Chinese Biographical Dictionary, p. 687.

Qing dynasty politicians from Shanxi
1683 births
1753 deaths
18th-century Chinese people
Politicians from Taiyuan
Assistant Grand Secretaries
Viceroys of Huguang
Viceroys of Zhili